Vila do Porto ("Port Town") is the single municipality, the name of the main town and one of the civil parishes on the  island of Santa Maria, in the Portuguese archipelago of Azores. Its nearest neighbor, administratively, is the municipality of Povoação on the southern coast of São Miguel (to the northwest), and it is physically southwest of the islets of the Formigas.

History 
Santa Maria was the first island in the archipelago to be discovered by Diogo Silves in 1427. By 2 July 1439, a royal charter from Infante D. Pedro, regent of D. Afonso V, referred to the fact that Prince Henry the Navigator had ordered that sheep be set ashore along the seven islands of the Azores (since Corvo and Flores had, at the time, not been discovered). São Miguel and Santa Maria were the first islands to be settled by families from Estremadura, Alto Alentejo and Algarve, facilitated by Gonçalo Velho, then first donatary-captain of the Azores. Gonçalo Velho Cabral, nobleman in the House of the Infante D. Henrique (Henry the Navigator) and commander in the Order of Christ, arrived on the island of Santa Maria in 1432. In the cartography of the 14th Century, the island was referred to as Ilha dos Lobos (Island of Wolves, referring to the wolf seals that lived in the region at the time). It became the seat of the first Captaincy of the Azores, which initially included both Santa Maria and São Miguel.

Its first settlement originated in 1439, with the occupation of Praia dos Lobos (and eventually became the northern coastal village of Anjos). Around 1450, was the probably foundation of the settlement of Porto, by Fernão de Quental. Quental's colony was established along the south coast along an escarpment overlooking a small bay that afforded protection for ships: what would become known as the Vila do Porto (town of the port). This town would become incorporated in 1470, when the town of Porto received the obligatory and first foral (charter), in addition to the establishment of the first lighthouse in the Azores. Although never experiencing earthquakes since its initial settlement (in comparison to the other islands in the Azores), the community was always marked by isolation, inaccessibility and weak defensive position.

It was, by the beginning of the 17th century, the fortification of São Brás along the cliff-tops of Cimo da Rocha, was constructed, near the hermitage dedicated to Our Lady of the Conception.

In 1901, it received an official visit from King Carlos I of Portugal and Queen Amélie, and later that year elected the first Republican municipal government.

Between 1942 and 1944, in the context of the Second World War,  the airport was constructed to provide support and emergency facilities for the island. This airport was transferred to the Portuguese Air Force in 1946, and the barrio (Bairro do Aeroporto) was begun by architect Keil do Amaral.

On 21 October 1992, the historical centre was protected, a zone delimited by Vila do Porto, under Regional Legislative Decree 22/92/A. By 24 August 2004, a new document was published by the regional legislature (Decree 29/2004/A), that set out the jurisdictional regime to protect, conserve and promote the cultural heritage; classified under article 58, the "historic centre" of Vila do Porto, was reclassified as a Group of Public Interest, and the older protections revoked.

Geography 

The municipality covers the entirety of the island of Santa Maria, in the eastern edge of the archipelago of the Azores. Nascently a coastal municipality, the settlements are nonetheless located over a cliff-top platform, dominated in the west by a semi-arid plain and in the east by the hugged flanks of the Pico Alto mountainous ridge. Although its principal urban area is located along linear tracts in the southwestern coast (oriented north to south), there exist various urban settlements and agglomerations throughout the island.

The municipality incorporates the island of Santa Maria in its entirety, and is divided into five parishes (population in 2021):
 Almagreira – 617 residents / 
 Santa Bárbara – 370 residents / 
 Santo Espírito – 597 residents / 
 São Pedro – 812 residents / 
 Vila do Porto – 3,012 residents /

Sister city
Vila do Porto's sister city is:
  Hudson, Massachusetts, USA

Architecture

Civic
 Administrative Building of the Forest Service of Vila do Porto
 Barracks of the Fiscal Guard
 Fountain of Largo Coronel Costa Santos
 Fountain of Largo Luís Figueiredo
 Fountain of Largo Jaime Figueiredo
 Fountain of São José
 Lagar of Diogo Fernandes Faleiro, located in São Lourenço (Santa Bárbara); carved volcanic rocks used for squeezing grapes into wine.
 Lighthouse of Gonçalo Velho, also referred to as lighthouse of Maia, is located in Maia (Santo Espírito); 
 LORAN Station of Santa Maria, located in the locality of Norte, Santa Bárbara; the long-range navigation station was operated by NATO, deactivated and in ruins since 1980.
 Manorhouse of João Falcão de Sousa
 Manorhouse/Chapel of Santa Rita, a private residence situated near Carreira (Almagreira)
 Museum of Santa Maria
 Primary School and Cantina of Vila do Porto
 Public Washhouse of Santo António
 Residence of Captain João Soares de Sousa, 3rd Captain-Donatário, located in Vila do Porto; a villa of one of the island's Captains-major, who governed in the name of the crown;
 Residence of Father Manuel
 Whale-Processing Station/Factory of Santo Espírito, located in Maia (Santo Espírito); in ruins since whale-hunting was prohibited
 Windmill of Ginjal

Military
 Fort of Baía de São Lourenço, located in São Lourenço (Santa Bárbara); ruins (mostly rock) of fort situated beside port of São Lourenço.
 Fort of Baixa do Vigário, located in Praia Formosa (Almagreira); ruins of fort east of the Bay of Praia.
 Fort of Figueiral, located in Figuerial (Vila do Porto); ruins overlooking the Ponte do Figueiral
 Fort of Forca
 Fort of Laje de Vila do Porto, located in Vila do Porto 
 Fort of Maia, located in Maia (Santo Espírito)
 Fort of Prainha
 Fort of Nossa Senhora da Praia dos Anjos
 Fort of São Brás, built in the 16th century, during Spanish occupation, location of the Chapel of Nossa Senhora da Conceição and obelisk to the memory of the crew of the warship NRP Carvalho Araújo.
 Fort of São João Baptista of Praia Formosa
 Fort of São João Evangelista
 Fort of Cabrestante
 Fort of Marvão

Religious
 Church of Nossa Senhora do Ar, located near Santa Maria airport (Ginjal), Vila do Porto 
 Church of Nossa Senhora da Assunção, located centrally in Vila do Porto; built in the 15th century and remodeled in the 16th century.
 Church of Nossa Senhora do Bom Despacho, constructed under the orders of Manuel de Moura and his wife, Inês Pereira, in the early 18th century, and evolved into the parochial church of Almagreira;
 Church of Nossa Senhora da Purificação, located in Santo Espírito
 Church of Santa Bárbara, dating to the middle of the 17th century, the parochial church of Santa Bárbara is marked by presbytery and lateral angular chapels;
 Church of Santo Antão, located in the Largo de Santo Antão, Vila do Porto
 Church of São Pedro, located in Largo da Igreja, São Pedro
 Church of the Misericórdia
 Convent of São Francisco/Municipal Palace/Hall of Vila do Porto - located in Vila do Porto ; constructed in the 17th century, containing ornate azulejo tiles of the period, today housing the seat of the municipality of Vila do Porto, addorsed to this, is the Chapel of Nossa Senhora da Vitória.
 Hermitage of Corpo Santo/São Pedro Gonçalves Telmo, located beside the Largo Sousa e Silva (Vila do Porto)
 Hermitage of Jesus, Maria and Joseph - located in São Lourenço (Santa Bárbara)
 Hermitage of Mãe de Deus, located in Vila do Porto
 Hermitage of Nossa Senhora dos Anjos - located in Anjos (Vila do Porto); considered the oldest religious structure on the island, where Christopher Columbus celebrated a mass in honor of his discovery in the New World.
 Hermitage of Nossa Senhora da Boa Morte, located in Santo Espírito
 Hermitage of Nossa Senhora da Boa Nova, located in Vila do Porto 
 Hermitage of Nossa Senhora da Boa Viagem, located near Santana (Vila do Porto)
 Hermitage of Nossa Senhora da Conceição, located in Largo Sousa e Silva, attached to the Fort of São Brás (Vila do Porto)
 Hermitage of Nossa Senhora do Desterro, located in Desterro, São Lourenço (Santa Bárbara)
 Hermitage of Nossa Senhora de Fátima, located in Fátima (São Pedro); in 1925, the first chapel to be constructed following the visions at Cova de Iria (Fátima)
 Hermitage of Nossa Senhora da Glória, located in Glória (Santo Espírito)
 Hermitage of Nossa Senhora da Graça, located in Almagreira 
 Hermitage of Nossa Senhora do Livramento, located along Rua do Livramento, Vila do Porto
 Hermitage of Nossa Senhora de Lourdes, located in Norte (Santa Bárbara), the isolated single-nave hermitage in the region of Norte, is known for its main altar, constructed using volcanic stone, resembling the grotto where the Marian apparition occurred in Lourdes, France;
 Hermitage of Nossa Senhora de Monserrate, located in Paul (São Pedro)
 Hermitage of Nossa Senhora do Monte, located in the (private) Quinta do Monte (Almagreira)
 Hermitage of Nossa Senhora da Piedade, located in Malbusca (Santo Espírito)
 Hermitage of Nossa Senhora do Pilar, located in Pilar (São Pedro)
 Hermitage of Nossa Senhora dos Prazeres, located in Maia (Santo Espírito)
 Hermitage of Nossa Senhora dos Remédios, located in Praia Formosa (Almagreira)
 Hermitage of Nossa Senhora da Saúde, located in São Pedro
 Hermitage of Santo Amaro, dedicated to Saint Maurus (but, later to Our Lady of Medicine), this simple, coastal chapel is located alongside Ribeira da Praia, of plastered masonry brickwork. The single-nave chapel includes well-preserved wood pulpit, designed in the Baroque-style and ancillary sacristy.
 Hermitage of Santo António, located in Santo António (Santo Espírito)
 Hermitage of São Lourenço, located in São Lourenço (Santa Bárbara)
 Império of the Holy Spirit of Boa Viagem
 Império of the Holy Spirit of Milagres
 Império of the Holy Spirit of Nossa Senhora da Glória* Império of the Holy Spirit of Piedade
 Império of the Holy Spirit of Salvaterra
 Império of the Holy Spirit of Santa Bárbara, the small, unimposing treatro or chapel dedicated to the annual celebrations of the Cult of the Holy Spirit, was dedicated in 1900, to replace existent temporary structures. The simple one-room space includes altar and space for the artifacts of the religious and ceremonial processions held throughout the period following Pentecost Sunday;
 Império of the Holy Spirit of Santo Antão
 Império of the Holy Spirit of Santo António
 Recolhimento de Santa Maria Madalena, located in Vila do Porto; constructed in 1594 by Father Corvelo Resende who, along with his brothers decided to establish a monastery to the Order of Santa Clara.  The first mass was celebrated in 1600.
 Recolhimento de Santo António, located in Vila do Porto
 Way of the Cross of Vila do Porto

References

Further reading 
 
 
 
 
 
 

 
Municipalities of the Azores